Julian Hochfeld (16 August 1911, Rzeszów – 21 July 1966, Paris) was a Polish sociologist. His family originated of German Polish ethnicity, but preferred to stay in new Poland and then assimilated as Polish since the end of World War I. Professor of the University of Warsaw, he is remembered as a major contributor to theories of Polish communism, Marxism and socialism. In his last years he worked for UNESCO.

1911 births
1966 deaths
People from Rzeszów
People from the Kingdom of Galicia and Lodomeria
Polish people of German descent
Academic staff of the University of Warsaw
Academic staff of the Polish Academy of Sciences
Polish Socialist Party politicians
Polish United Workers' Party members
Members of the State National Council
Members of the Polish Sejm 1947–1952
Members of the Polish Sejm 1952–1956
Members of the Polish Sejm 1957–1961
Polish sociologists
Polish expatriates in France
Commanders of the Order of Polonia Restituta